Saoirse-Monica Jackson (born November 1993) is a Northern Irish actress, best known for portraying Erin Quinn on the Channel 4 sitcom Derry Girls between 2018 and 2022.

Early life 
Jackson was born in Derry in November 1993. She split her time growing up in Derry and Greencastle, County Donegal, where her parents ran a village pub. After obtaining GCSEs and A-Levels at St Cecilia's College in Derry, she trained in acting at the Arden School of Theatre in Manchester.

Career 
Jackson's television debut came in 2016 when she landed the role of Sasha in Harlan Coben's The Five, appearing in four episodes. In 2016, she also played Curley's wife in the Birmingham Repertory Theatre tour of John Steinbeck's Of Mice and Men. She appeared briefly in the final episode of 2017 BBC One drama series Broken. In 2018, she portrayed Shena Carney in a West End production of The Ferryman at the Gielgud Theatre.

Jackson made her debut as Erin Quinn in the Channel 4 sitcom Derry Girls in the show's first episode, airing on Channel 4 on 4 January 2018. Her performance was well received and, in turn, saw her nominated for the IFTA Gala Television Award for Best Female Performance. She portrayed the role for three series until the conclusion of the show in May 2022.

She appeared in an episode of The Great British Bake Off: Festive Specials.

On 26 June 2020, she and her fellow Derry Girls co stars performed a sketch with Saoirse Ronan for the RTÉ fundraising special RTÉ Does Comic Relief. All proceeds from the night went towards those affected by the COVID-19 pandemic.

Filmography

Film

Television

References

External links

1993 births
Living people
21st-century actresses from Northern Ireland
Actors from Derry (city)
People from County Donegal
Television actresses from Northern Ireland